T-Wayne is a collaborative mixtape by American recording artists T-Pain and Lil Wayne. Recorded in 2009, it was delayed due to Lil Wayne's legal troubles and was unexpectedly released for free streaming on May 18, 2017, by Nappy Boy Entertainment & Young Money Entertainment. T-Pain initially leaked a cover for the album and then several hours later posted it in its entirety for free download on mixtape sharing sites.

Track listing
All tracks produced by Tha Bizness, unless otherwise noted.

Sample credits
"Listen to Me" samples the Oompa Loompa "Augustus Gloop Song" from the movie Willy Wonka & the Chocolate Factory
"Breathe" samples "Did It On'em" by Nicki Minaj
"Snap Ya Fangas" interpolates "Forgot About Me" by Scarface featuring Lil Wayne and Bun B
"Heavy Chevy" interpolates "American Pie" by Don McLean

Personnel
Lil Wayne – vocals on all tracks except "Oh Yeah"
T-Pain – vocals with production on "He Rap He Sang" and "Snap Ya Fangas"

Bangladesh – production on "Breathe"
Tha Bizness – production on "Listen to Me", "Damn Damn Damn", "Waist of a Wasp", "Oh Yeah", and "Heavy Chevy"
Pencil Fingerz – creation of the album's cover artwork

References

External links
Full album streaming from T-Pain's Soundcloud account

2017 mixtape albums
Albums produced by Bangladesh (record producer)
Albums produced by Tha Bizness
Collaborative albums
Lil Wayne albums
Nappy Boy Entertainment albums
T-Pain albums
Young Money Entertainment albums
Albums produced by T-Pain